The Northern Neck Shanty Singers are a musical group based in the Northern Neck region of Virginia.  The group performs a variety of sea chanties in the tradition of the African-American menhaden fisherman of the Virginia coast.

References

Musical groups from Virginia